Look Who's Talking stylized as Look Whos Talking! - The Album is the third studio album by European-based Nigerian artist Dr. Alban. It was released in 1994 through BMG, Ariola and Rec.Service.

Track listing
 "Hard Pan Di Drums" (6:22)	
 "Look Who's Talking! (3:13)	
 "Free Up Soweto" (3:24)	
 "Away from Home" (3:45)	
 "Gimme Dat Lovin" (4:06)	
 "Let the Beat Go On" (3:56)	
 "Fire" (3:41)	
 "Home Sweet Home" (3:11)	
 "Go See the Dentist" (4:27)	
 "Sweet Little Girl" (3:05)	
 "Plastic Smile" (3:42)	
 "Awillawillawillahey" (4:10)	
 "Look Who's Talking! (Stone's Radio)" (4:07)

Charts

Weekly charts

Year-end charts

Sales and certifications

References

1994 albums
Dr. Alban albums